San Diego-Scripps Coastal Marine Conservation Area (SMCA) and Matlahuayl State Marine Reserve (SMR) are adjoining marine protected areas that extend offshore from La Jolla in San Diego County on California’s south coast. The two marine protected areas cover 2.51 square miles.  San Diego-Scripps Coastal SMCA prohibits the take of all living marine resources except that coastal pelagic species, not including market squid, may be taken recreationally by hook and line.  Matlahuayl SMR prohibits the take of all living marine resources.

History

San Diego-Scripps Coastal (SMCA) and Matlahuayl (SMR) are both a part of the southern region of California's network of Marine Protected Areas that were established in 1999 with the passing of the California Marine Life Protection Act (MLPA), the first act of this nature to be passed across the United States. With the passing of this act, California resorted to regional delegation by splitting the state into five large sections: the north coast, the south coast, the north-central coast, the central coast, and the San Francisco Bay. This act built upon the Marine Life Management Act passed in 1998, which was created to protect specific marine species. The drive behind this new act for marine protection was largely influenced by the desire to protect entire ecosystems and habitats to more effectively provide a safe haven for marine life. They are two of the 37 marine protected areas adopted by the California Fish and Game Commission in December, 2010 during the third phase of the Marine Life Protection Act Initiative. They were added to the set of pre-existing MPAs, totalling 50 MPAs within the southern region and 355 square miles of marine protected waters. The set of MPAs in California was finalized in 2012, leading to the current protection of 16% of California's waters and creating a much higher level of protection for the valuable marine life diversity along the California Coast. 

The MLPAI is a collaborative public process to create a statewide network of protected areas along California’s coastline.

The name Matlahuayl was adopted in honor of the Kumeyaay, a local indigenous people. The Kumeyaay referred to the area now known as La Jolla as mat kulaaxuuy ("land of holes"), probably in reference to the numerous sea caves in the area.

The south coast’s new marine protected areas were designed by local divers, fishermen, conservationists and scientists who comprised the South Coast Regional Stakeholder Group.  Their job was to design a network of protected areas that would preserve sensitive sea life and habitats while enhancing recreation, study and education opportunities.

The south coast marine protected areas went into effect on January first 2012.

Geography and natural features

San Diego-Scripps Coastal SMCA and Matlahuayl SMR are marine protected areas that extend offshore from La Jolla in San Diego County on California’s south coast.

San Diego-Scripps Coastal SMCA is bounded by the mean high tide line and straight lines connecting the following points in the order listed:
 
  
  and
 .

Matlahuayl SMR is bounded by the mean high tide line and straight lines connecting the
following points in the order listed:
 
  and
 .

Habitat and wildlife

San Diego-Scripps Coastal SMCA and Matlahuayl SMR protect most of the unique Scripps Canyon branch of La Jolla's submarine canyon system and the southernmost natural California mussel bed. The area is a hotbed of biodiversity and sustains a thriving ecosystem.  The areas encompass four distinct habitat zones; rocky reef, kelp forest, sandy flat, and deepwater canyon. In a study focused around the benefits of MPAs, it was found that throughout the La Jolla region, there were half of the known California fish species present. This study also found that 265 species spread across 95 families were found within these La Jolla adjacent MPAs. 

This marine protected area complex is among the oldest in California.  Though the boundaries were recently changed just slightly under the Marine Life Protection Act, the area has been protected since 1970 when the City of San Diego proclaimed it an underwater park and ecological reserve and is known as the San Diego-La Jolla Underwater Park.

Recreation and nearby attractions

Nearby La Jolla Shores is one of San Diego’s most popular beach going destinations. The long, wide stretch of sand provides plenty of room for families to picnic and build sand castles, set up volleyball nets, or a game of Frisbee.  A vehicle friendly small boat and kayak launch is located at the end of Avenida De La Playa.  Local companies offer tours that include kayaking, snorkeling, scuba diving, and trips though the famed sea caves beneath the cliffs.  Recreational fishing from a kayak is especially popular just outside the protected areas. For a more tucked away experience, visitors can find Blacks Beach a little farther north along the coast. 

The easy access makes La Jolla Cove a superb dive location. The abundant and healthy marine life and habitat here makes it a draw for beginners and experts alike.  It is not uncommon for underwater visibility in the cove to exceed 30 feet.  Visitors can expect to see an array of fish and sea birds, as well as sea lions, harbor seals, dolphins, and even the occasional sea turtle. The Cave Store sits along Coast Avenue with the a tunnel allowing guests to view the connected sea cave. 

Children's Pool Beach (also known as Casa Beach), just to the south of La Jolla Cove, has become a famous haul-out and breeding spot for harbor seals, where they can be seen year-round basking on the shore. There are many tide pools in this vicinity to explore.  Visitors can relax and picnic at Kellogg Park, a large grassy area adjacent to the beach with barbecue pits, a playground and restrooms.

Another area attraction is Birch Aquarium.  The aquarium is associated with the world-renowned Scripps Institution of Oceanography and is open to the public.

San Diego-Scripps Coastal SMCA prohibits the take of all living marine resources except that coastal pelagic species, not including market squid, may be taken recreationally by hook and line.  Matlahuayl SMR prohibits the take of all living marine resources.  However, California’s marine protected areas encourage recreational and educational uses of the ocean.  Activities such as kayaking, diving, snorkeling, and swimming are allowed.

Scientific monitoring

As specified by the Marine Life Protection Act, select marine protected areas along California’s central coast are being monitored by scientists to track their effectiveness and learn more about ocean health. Similar studies in marine protected areas located off of the Santa Barbara Channel Islands have already detected gradual improvements in fish size and number. 

Students and employees of University of California, San Diego, have also been permitted to use this area to conduct research and are allowed to take many marine species under the authorization of a scientific collection permit.

See also
San Diego-La Jolla Underwater Park

References

External links 
Marine Life Protection Act Initiative
CalOceans
La Jolla Beaches
Kellogg Park
Birch Aquarium

Protected areas of San Diego County, California